Kirovsk–Apatity Airport, also known as Khibiny Airport or Hibiny Airport  is an airport in Apatity, Murmansk Oblast, Russia.

Kirovsk–Apatity Airport was officially opened in 1994, developed on a former Soviet Air Force/Russian Air Force airfield with a single tarmac area that hosted the 227th Independent Helicopter Squadron flying Mi-8 helicopters between 1992 and 2000 and the 88th Independent Helicopter Squadron between 1977 and 1994. The airfield was revamped to serve the towns of Apatity and Kirovsk for civilian use, and in 1994 began operating flights to Sheremetyevo Airport. Currently, Kirovsk–Apatity Airport handles medium-sized airliners for domestic flights to several cities in Northwest Russia, with intentions to be developed into an international airport.

Airlines and destinations

References

External links

 Kirovsk–Apatity Airport Aviateka.su

Soviet Air Force bases
Russian Air Force bases
Airports built in the Soviet Union
Airports in Murmansk Oblast